Genie M. Smith (pen names, Maude Meredith and Kit Clover; born November 17, 1852) was an American author and publisher.

Early life
Genie M. Boyce was born on a farm in Vermont, on November 17, 1852. Her father was an invalid, and she was left to live an out-door life in childhood.

Career
Genie M. Smith was widely known by her pen-names, "Maude Meredith" and "Kit Clover". She was a prolific author of serials, poetry, short stories and papers on home subjects for women. "Maude Meredith" began her literary career in the columns of the Chicago Tribune in 1880. The following year she issued The Rivulet and Clover Blooms, a small volume of poems. In 1883 she wrote St. Julian's Daughter, a novel of Dubuque in pioneer days. 

In 1884, she edited and published the Mid-Continent, a magazine which died young. In 1886-87-88 she edited the Housekeeper and created for that periodical its extensive reputation. Among other periodicals to which she has contributed are the Independent, Literary' Life, Peterson's Magazine, Chicago Inter Ocean, the Current, St. Louis Magazine, Golden Days, Journalist, Godey's Lady's Book, the Writer, St. Paul Pioneer Press, Northwest Magazine, Home-Maker, Ladies' World, and Ladies' Home Companion. 

She published two novels, Winsome but Wicked (Chicago, 1892), and The Parson's Sin (Chicago, 1892) and had other novels in press, and also The Columbian Cook-Book. In 1886 she published Our Money-Makers, a practical poultry book.

Personal life
Genie M. Boyce married, at an early age, Colonel Dwight T. Smith (d. 1903), manager of the Consolidated Tank Line, and moved to Dubuque, Iowa. They had four children, two of whom died in infancy. Her daughter Georgia died in an accident in 1890: she was seated in a buggy in front of her father's office when a runaway attached to a lumber wagon came down Main street extension. Georgia jumped directly between the horses and died in the impact.

References

1852 births
19th-century American women writers
19th-century American writers
American magazine publishers (people)
Writers from Vermont
Year of death missing
People from Dubuque, Iowa
Wikipedia articles incorporating text from A Woman of the Century